The Turner angle Tu, introduced by Ruddick(1983)  and named after J. Stewart Turner, is a parameter used to describe the local stability of an inviscid water column as it undergoes double-diffusive convection. The temperature and salinity attributes, which generally determine the water density, both respond to the water vertical structure. By putting these two variables in orthogonal coordinates, the angle with the axis can indicate the importance of the two in stability. Turner angle is defined as:

where tan−1 is the four-quadrant arctangent; α is the coefficient of thermal expansion; β is the equivalent coefficient for the addition of salinity, sometimes referred to as the "coefficient of saline contraction"; θ is potential temperature; and S is salinity. The relation between Tu and stability is as shown 
 If −45° < Tu < 45°, the column is statically stable.
 If −90° < Tu < −45°, the column is unstable to diffusive convection.
 If 45° < Tu < 90°, the column is unstable to salt fingering.
 If −90° > Tu or Tu > 90°, the column is statically unstable to Rayleigh–Taylor instability.

Relation to density ratio 
Turner angle is related to the density ratio mathematically by:

Meanwhile, Turner angle has more advantages than density ratio in aspects of:
 The strong fingering and weak fingering regions occupy about the same space on the Tu scale;
 The indeterminate value obtained when  is well defined in terms of Tu;
 The regimes and their corresponding angles are easy to remember, and symmetric in the sense that if Tu corresponds to Rρ, then -Tu corresponds to Rρ−1. This links roughly equal strengths of finger and diffusive sense convection.
Nevertheless, Turner angle is not as directly obvious as density ratio when assessing different attributions of thermal and haline stratification. Its strength mainly focuses on classification.

Physical description 

Turner angle is usually discussed when researching ocean stratification and double diffusion.

Turner angle assesses the vertical stability, indicating the density of the water column changes with depth. The density is generally related to potential temperature and salinity profile: the cooler and saltier the water is, the denser it is. As the light water overlays on the dense water, the water column is called stable stratification. The buoyancy force preserves stable stratification. One characteristic of stability is that the Brunt-Vaisala frequency N2>0, which includes three situations of doubly stable, thermal diffusion, and salt fingering. Considering the density attribute to both temperature and salinity, a "double stable" status, where the temperature decreases with depth (∂θ/∂z>0) and salinity increases with depth (∂S/∂z<0), is the most ideal stable water column, which means the water column is stably stratified with respect to both θ and S.

The water column can maintain stability even though one attribute does not agree. In one case of heat diffusion dominant, diffusive double-diffusion is possible when the salinity structure is stable while the temperature structure is unstable (∂θ/∂z<0, ∂S/∂z<0). In the other case, salt fingering can be expected when relatively warm, salty water overlies relatively colder, fresher water (∂θ/∂z>0, ∂S/∂z>0). Both these cases lead to turbulence and mixing on the vertical structure of the water column.

Since Turner angle can indicate the thermal and haline properties of the water column, it is used to discuss water thermal and haline structures,  and demonstrated benefits of localizing the boundaries of the subarctic front.

Characteristics 

The global meridional Turner angle distributions at the surface and 300-m depth in different seasons are investigated by Tippins, Duncan & Tomczak, Matthias (2003), which indicates the overall stability of the ocean over a long-time scale. It's worth noting that 300-m depth is deep enough to be beneath the mixed layer during all seasons over most of the subtropics, yet shallow enough to be located entirely in the permanent thermocline, even in the tropics.

At the surface, as the temperature and salinity increase from the Subpolar Front towards subtropics, the Turner angle is positive, while it becomes negative due to the meridional salinity gradient being reversed on the equatorial side of the subtropical surface salinity maximum. Tu becomes positive again in the Pacific and Atlantic Oceans near the equator. A band of negative Tu in the South Pacific extends westward along 45°S, produced by the low salinities because of plenty of rainfall, off the southern coast of Chile.

In 300-m depth, it is dominated by positive Tu nearly everywhere except for only narrow bands of negative Turner angles. This reflects the shape of the permanent thermocline, which sinks to its greatest depth in the center of the oceanic gyres and then rises again towards the equator, and which also indicates a vertical structure in temperature and salinity where both decrease with depth.

Availability 

The function of Turner angle is available:

For Python, published in the GSW Oceanographic Toolbox from the function gsw_Turner_Rsubrho.

For R, please reference this page Home/CRAN/gsw/gsw_Turner_Rsubrho: Turner Angle and Density Ratio.

For MATLAB, please reference this page GSW-Matlab/gsw_Turner_Rsubrho.m.

References

External links 
 The Gibbs SeaWater (GSW) Oceanographic Toolbox of TEOS-10
 gsw_Turner_Rsubrho
Home/CRAN/gsw/gsw_Turner_Rsubrho: Turner Angle and Density Ratio.
GSW-Matlab/gsw_Turner_Rsubrho.m

Fluid dynamics
Oceanography